David Guy Classon (September 27, 1870 – September 6, 1930) was an American lawyer and politician.  He represented Wisconsin's 9th congressional district in the United States House of Representatives for three terms.

Biography

David G. Classon was born in Oconto, Wisconsin. He attended the public schools, and graduated from the law department of the University of Wisconsin–Madison in 1891, earning his LL.B. He was admitted to the bar the same year and commenced practice in Oconto.  He was elected county judge of Oconto County, Wisconsin, from 1894 to 1898, and was then elected Mayor of Oconto from 1898 to 1900. After his two terms as mayor, he served as City attorney from 1900 to 1906, as president of the board of education in 1912 and 1913, and as president of the board of fire and police commissioners in 1915 and 1916.

In 1916, Classon was elected as a Republican to represent Wisconsin's 9th congressional district in the Sixty-fifth Congress, defeating Democratic incumbent Thomas F. Konop.  He was then re-elected to the Sixty-sixth, and Sixty-seventh Congresses, serving until March 3, 1923. In Congress, he was one of the two Wisconsin congressmen who voted in favor of the declaration of war with Germany during World War I, out of the eleven members of the Wisconsin delegation. He was opposed to prohibition.

He declined to be a candidate for renomination in 1922. He resumed the practice of law in Oconto, Wisconsin. After returning to Oconto, he served as circuit judge of the 20th circuit (1928–1930), filling the unexpired term of William B. Quinlan. He died at his home in Oconto, Wisconsin, on September 6, 1930. He was interred in Evergreen Cemetery.

Electoral history

| colspan="6" style="text-align:center;background-color: #e9e9e9;"| General Election, November 7, 1916

| colspan="6" style="text-align:center;background-color: #e9e9e9;"| General Election, November 5, 1916

| colspan="6" style="text-align:center;background-color: #e9e9e9;"| General Election, November 2, 1916

References

Other sources

External links
 

1870 births
1930 deaths
People from Oconto, Wisconsin
Wisconsin state court judges
Mayors of places in Wisconsin
University of Wisconsin Law School alumni
Republican Party members of the United States House of Representatives from Wisconsin